Tolutau Koula (born 2 September 2002) is a Tonga international rugby league footballer who plays as a  and  for the Manly-Warringah Sea Eagles in the NRL.

Background
Koula's parents represented Tonga at multiple Olympic Games. His father, Tolutau Koula Sr, was a sprinter and his mother, Ana Siulolo Liku, was a hurdler.

Koula Jr set the GPS sprint record in 2019 at 10.58 seconds. He graduated from Newington College in 2020, where he was the Athletics Captain

Playing career
Koula made his debut in round 1 of the 2022 NRL season for Manly-Warringah in a 28-6 loss to Penrith. Following this, he was announced as a member of the Tongan national rugby league team, where he will start at fullback against New Zealand on June 25.

Koula played 20 games for Manly in the 2022 NRL season as the club finished 11th on the table and missed out on the finals. He was one of seven players involved in the Manly pride jersey player boycott.

References

External links

Sea Eagles profile

2002 births
Living people
Australian rugby league players
Australian sportspeople of Tongan descent
People educated at Newington College
Manly Warringah Sea Eagles players
Rugby league fullbacks
Rugby league players from Sydney
Rugby league centres
Rugby league wingers
Tonga national rugby league team players